The South Korea national women's cricket team is the team that represents the country of South Korea in international women's cricket. They made their international debut in the 2014 Asian Games in South Korea in September 2014. 

In 2017, the South Korean team participated in the Women's East Asia Cup in Hong Kong.

In April 2018, the International Cricket Council (ICC) granted full Women's Twenty20 International (WT20I) status to all its members. Therefore, all Twenty20 matches played between South Korea women and other ICC members after 1 July 2018 will be a full WT20I.

Tournament history

Asian Games
2014: First round

Women East Asia Cup
2015: 4th place
2017: 4th place
2019: 4th place

Records and Statistics 

International Match Summary — South Korea Women
 
Last updated 22 September 2019

Twenty20 International 

 Highest team total: 117/5 (18.1 overs) v China on 4 November 2018 at Yeonhui Cricket Ground, Incheon.
 Highest individual score: 51*, Mina Baek v China on 4 November 2018 at Yeonhui Cricket Ground, Incheon.
 Best individual bowling figures: 4/17, Mina Baek v Japan on 22 September 2019 at Yeonhui Cricket Ground, Incheon.

T20I record versus other nations

Records complete to WT20I #768. Last updated 22 September 2019.

See also
 List of South Korea women Twenty20 International cricketers

References

Women's
Women's national cricket teams
Cricket